Charles Cornwallis, 1st Marquess Cornwallis  (1738–1805) was a British Army officer and colonial administrator.

Cornwallis may also refer to:

Places

Antarctica
Cornwallis Island (South Shetland Islands)

Australia
Cornwallis, New South Wales
Dauan Island or Cornwallis Island, one of the Torres Strait Islands

Canada
Cornwallis, Manitoba (rural municipality)
Cornwallis Island (Nunavut)
Cornwallis River, Kings County, Nova Scotia
Cornwallis Township, Kings County, Nova Scotia
Cornwallis Park, Nova Scotia
Cornwallis Square, Nova Scotia
Cornwallis Junior High School in Halifax
CFB Cornwallis, a former Canadian Forces Base
Little Cornwallis Island, Nunavut

New Zealand
Cornwallis, New Zealand, Auckland Region
Cornwallis Beach

United Kingdom
Cornwallis Academy, Kent, England

United States
Cornwallis, West Virginia

Other uses
Cornwallis Valley Railway, a branchline of the Dominion Atlantic Railway
SS Cornwallis, a Canadian freighter attacked by German submarine U-514
HMS Cornwallis, several ships of the Royal Navy
Cornwallis, one of several 18th-19th century vessels
Fort Cornwallis, a star fort built by the British East India Company in Penang, present-day Malaysia

People with the surname
Kinahan Cornwallis (1883–1959), British diplomat
Thomas Cornwallis (1605–1675), one of the first commissioners of the Province of Maryland (brother of Sir William)
Thomas Cornwallis (died 1604), MP for Grampound
Sir William Cornwallis (died 1614) ( – 1614), British essayist
George Cornwallis-West (1874–1951), stepfather of Winston Churchill

Aristocratic title
Baron Cornwallis
Earl Cornwallis
Marquess Cornwallis

Aristocratic English family
Charles Cornwallis, 3rd Baron Cornwallis (1655–1698), who served as First Lord of the Admiralty
Edward Cornwallis (1713–1776), British colonialist and founder of Halifax, Canada
Frederick Cornwallis (1713–1783), Archbishop of Canterbury
Sir William Cornwallis (1744–1819), British admiral during the Napoleonic Wars

People with the given name
William Cornwallis Symonds (1810–1841), British officer in New Zealand

See also

 
 Cornwall (disambiguation)
 Cornouailles, England, UK
 Cornouaille, Brittany, France
 Cornouaille (disambiguation)